Gymnemic acids are a class of chemical compounds isolated from the leaves of Gymnema sylvestre (Asclepiadaceae).  They are anti-sweet compounds, or sweetness inhibitors. After chewing the leaves, solutions sweetened with sugar taste like water.

Chemically, gymnemic acids are triterpenoid glycosides.  The central structure is the aglycone gymnemagenin (C30H50O6). This is adorned with a sugar such as glucuronic acid and with various ester groups.  These variations give rise to the different gymnemic acids.  More than 20 homologs of gymnemic acid are known.

Gymnemic acid I has the highest anti-sweet properties.  It suppresses the sweetness of most of the sweeteners including intense artificial sweeteners such as aspartame and natural sweeteners such as thaumatin, a sweet protein. The anti-sweet activity is reversible, but sweetness recovery on the tongue can take more than 10 minutes.

Example chemical structures

See also 
Other anti-sweeteners:
 Hodulcine, a dammarane-type triterpene glycoside from the leaves of Hovenia dulcis
 Lactisole, sodium 2-(4-methoxyphenoxy)propanoate
 Ziziphin, a triterpene glycoside, C51H80O18
 Gurmarin

References 

Taste modifiers
Triterpene glycosides